Dolž is a settlement in the hills southeast of Novo Mesto in southeastern Slovenia, close to the border with Croatia. The entire area is part of the traditional region of Lower Carniola and is now included in the Southeast Slovenia Statistical Region.

The local church is dedicated to Saints Cosmas and Damian and belongs to the Parish of Stopiče. It was built in the mid-18th century.

References

External links
Dolž on Geopedia

Populated places in the City Municipality of Novo Mesto